The title Earl of Dunbar, also called Earl of Lothian or Earl of March, was the head of a comital lordship in south-eastern Scotland between the early 12th century and the early 15th century. The first man to use the title of Earl in this earldom was Gospatric II, Earl of Lothian, son of Gospatric, Earl of Northumbria. It descended to George de Dunbar, 11th Earl of March, who was forfeited by parliament of his titles & estates in 1435, and retired into obscurity in England. His son Patrick retained a barony at Kilconquhar in Fife.

The title of Earl of Dunbar was resurrected in 1605 for George Home, 1st Lord Hume of Berwick, Chancellor of the Exchequer, and his heirs male. This title became dormant only six years after its creation, upon Home's death in 1611. Some of his kinsmen were said to be acknowledged as de jure holders of the title, but none of them ever appears to have assumed the title.

There have been no subsequent creations; however, two other peerages with similar names are Lord of Dunbar and Viscount of Dunbar.

First creation

Using title "Earl of Lothian"
Gospatric II, Earl of Lothian (died 1138)
Gospatric III, Earl of Lothian (died 1166)

Using title "Earl of Dunbar"
Waltheof, Earl of Dunbar (died 1182)
Patrick I, Earl of Dunbar (1154–1232)
Patrick II, Earl of Dunbar (1186–1249)
Patrick III, Earl of Dunbar (1213–1289)

Using mainly the title "Earl of March"
Patrick IV, Earl of March (1242–1308)
Patrick V, Earl of March (1284–1368)
George I, Earl of March (1340–1422)
George II, Earl of March (c. 1370–1457)

Earls of Dunbar, Second Creation (1605)

George Home, 1st Earl of Dunbar (c.1556–1611) – died without male issue

Subsequent claimants to the title

John Home, de jure 2nd Earl of Dunbar (a 1628), brother of 1st Earl, according to the Lord Advocate in 1634, he “conceiving his fortune too mean, forebore to assume the dignity”. He died without male issue.
George Home, de jure 3rd Earl of Dunbar (a 1637), son of Alexander Home of Manderston and nephew of 1st Earl, certified in his claim in 1634 by the same Lord Advocate.
Alexander Home, de jure 4th Earl of Dunbar (d. 1675), son of 3rd Earl, said to have been confirmed in title by Charles II in 1651 but which does not appear in the Great Seal of Scotland. Died without male issue.
Alexander Hume, of Manderstone, de jure 5th Earl of Dunbar (b. 1651, d. 4 January 1720 Aurich, Germany), nephew of 4th Earl. Capt. of a troop of horse in the service of the States of Holland, later Geheimrat in Aurich, Germany. To him 14 October 1689, William III, King of England, Ireland and Scotland confirmed the Earldom of Dunbar exemplifying the previous confirmation thereof by Charles II. It is not known if Alexander Hume styled himself "Earl of Dunbar" in Germany, where he and his descendants rather are known as Grafen (Counts) Hume of Manderstone. He married the daughter of Leonard Fewen, General Steward of Emden, who inherited the manor house and estate of Stikelkamp at Hesel, East Frisia. His son—Leonard Hume (1684–1741), de jure 6th Earl of Dunbar—inherited the estate in Stikelkamp from his father. Leonard married Gesina Bruncken (1701–1763). A son of Leonard—Heere Andries Hume—was de jure the 7th Earl of Dunbar (b. 1738 in Norden). Leonard's daughter Helena Hume of Manderstone (1722–1784) inherited the estate of Stikelkamp; she married Bebäus Scato Kettwig; their daughter Isabella (1742–1797) married Eger Carl Christian Lantzius-Beninga (1744–1798); the Lantzius-Beninga family owned the Stikelkamp estate until 1971, when it was purchased by the Landkreis Leer. Note: No claimant has progressed his claim before the House of Lords Committee for Privileges to a satisfactory conclusion. This Committee was—until the Dissolution of Parliament on 12 April 2010—the only body which was authorised to decide whether or not a claimant may be confirmed in the title. The Lord Advocate of Scotland, for instance, has no authority in these matters, especially in the 17th century, given the corruption and nepotism rampant at that time. The usual way to establish the right to inherit a title is to apply for a Writ of Summons to attend Parliament (a procedure that will have to be reviewed in the light of new legislation abolishing the hereditary parliamentary rights of peers). Then the Committee for Privileges examines the validity of the documentation supporting the line of descent of the claimant and his relationship to the previous holder of the peerage title. Currently, there are several authorities who theoretically could recognize the use of the title "Earl of Dunbar", issued by William III.

In 1721 James Murray (c.1690–1770), second son of David Murray, 5th Viscount of Stormont, was created Earl of Dunbar, Viscount of Drumcairn and Lord of Hadykes in the Jacobite Peerage by James Francis Edward Stuart, the "Old Pretender".

In 1776, John Home, descended from David, second son of Sir David Home of Wedderburn, appears to have had himself Retoured heir male of the Earl of Dunbar, but the service was reduced by the Court of Session, at the instance of Sir George Home of Blackadder, Bt., another descendant of Sir David and descended from an immediate younger brother of Alexander Home, the first of Manderston (grandfather of George, 1st Earl).

In 1810 Sir John Home of Renton, Bt., served notice that he was preparing a case to lay before The House "to the title, honour, and dignity of Earl of Dunbar, as heir male to the first patentee". But it appears he did not pursue the case to a conclusion.

During the 19th century Mr Home Drummond of Blair Drummond, Perthshire, as descended from, and heir male of, Patrick Home of Renton, uncle of George, 1st Earl of Dunbar, also had a claim to that peerage.

See also
Earl of March

References

Dormant earldoms in the Peerage of Scotland
Forfeited earldoms in the Peerage of Scotland
Earldoms in the Jacobite Peerage
 
 
 
Noble titles created in 1072
Noble titles created in 1605